is a railway station in the city of Gosen, Niigata Prefecture, Japan, operated by East Japan Railway Company (JR East).

Lines

Station layout

The station consists of one ground-level side platform and one island platform serving three tracks, connected by a footbridge. The station is unattended.

Platforms

History
The station opened on 25 October 1910. With the privatization of Japanese National Railways (JNR) on 1 April 1987, the station came under the control of JR East.

Surrounding area
Maoroshi Post office
 Agano River

External links

JR East Maoroshi Station 

Railway stations in Niigata Prefecture
Ban'etsu West Line
Railway stations in Japan opened in 1910
Gosen, Niigata